The Battle of Jianwei was fought between the contending states of Shu Han and Cao Wei in the Three Kingdoms period of China. The battle was also the third of a series of military campaigns against Wei launched by Shu's chancellor, Zhuge Liang. The battle concluded with a Shu victory and the capture of Wudu and Yinping commanderies, which were located near present-day Longnan, Gansu.

The battle 
In the spring of 229, Zhuge Liang ordered Chen Shi to lead troops to attack the Wei-controlled Wudu (武都; near present-day Cheng County, Gansu) and Yinping (陰平; present-day Wen County, Gansu) commanderies, In response, Guo Huai led his troops in an attempt to rescue those commanderiesUpon receiving news that the Wei general Guo Huai had mobilised his forces to attack Chen Shi, Zhuge Liang moved his army from Yangping Pass to Jianwei (建威; in present-day Longnan, Gansu) in the northwestern corner of Wudu Commandery. 

Later; Guo Huai and his troops withdrew. The Shu forces thus successfully captured Wudu and Yinping commanderies.

Aftermath 
When Zhuge Liang returned from the campaign, the Shu emperor Liu Shan issued an imperial decree to congratulate him on his successes in defeating Wang Shuang during the second Northern Expedition, forcing Guo Huai to flee, winning back the trust of the local tribes and capturing Wudu and Yinping commanderies during the third Northern Expedition. He also restored Zhuge Liang to the position of Imperial Chancellor (丞相). 

Achilles Fang's translation of Liu Shan's memorial is as follows: 

Following this battle, Cao Wei's state would launch their own campaign the next year called the Ziwu Campaign.

References 

 Chen, Shou (3rd century). Records of the Three Kingdoms (Sanguozhi).
 de Crespigny, Rafe (2003). The Three Kingdoms and Western Jin; a history of China in the Third Century AD. https://digitalcollections.anu.edu.au/html/1885/42048/3KWJin.html 
 Pei, Songzhi (5th century). Annotations to Records of the Three Kingdoms (Sanguozhi zhu).
 

229
Jianwei
220s conflicts